The episodes of the original net animation (ONA) The Melancholy of Haruhi-chan Suzumiya were produced by Kyoto Animation and released on YouTube between February and May 2009. The episodes are based on a parody manga series of the same name based on the Haruhi Suzumiya series. The series does not fit into the normal continuity of the main series. During the first four episodes, the  characters in the series were rendered using computer-generated imagery. Soon afterward, the character animation returned to the standard two-dimensional animation style. Twenty-five episodes were created for the ONA series, with two episodes per week (episodes 1 and 2 were released on separate weeks), alongside an episode of another ONA, Nyoro~n Churuya-san, until the last, where an extra long episode was shown. The two series were released in Japan on DVD on May 29, 2009, with a Blu-ray released on August 17, 2010. The series was released in North America by Bandai Entertainment in 2011, and was relicensed by Funimation in 2014.

There are two pieces of theme music used for the show. A single of the two songs was released on April 20, 2009.

Episodes
{| class="wikitable" style="width: 98%;"
|- style="border-bottom:3px solid #CCF;"
! style="width: 5%;" | #
! Title
! style="width: 15%;" | Original airdate
|-

|}

Haruhi Suzumiya
Lists of anime episodes
Lists of science fiction television series episodes